Territorial disputes in the South China Sea involve conflicting island and maritime claims in the region by several sovereign states, namely Brunei, the People's Republic of China (PRC), Taiwan (Republic of China/ROC), Indonesia, Malaysia, Philippines, and Vietnam.
The disputes involve the islands, reefs, banks, and other features of the South China Sea, including the Spratly Islands, Paracel Islands, Scarborough Shoal, and various boundaries in the Gulf of Tonkin. The waters near the Indonesian Natuna Islands, which some regard as geographically part of the South China Sea, are disputed as well. Maritime disputes also extend beyond the South China Sea, as in the case of the Senkaku Islands and the Socotra Rock, which lie in the East China Sea.

An estimated US$3.37 trillion worth of global trade passes through the South China Sea annually, which accounts for a third of the global maritime trade. 80 percent of China's energy imports and 39.5 percent of China's total trade passes through the South China Sea. Claimant states are interested in retaining or acquiring the rights to fishing stocks, the exploration and potential exploitation of crude oil and natural gas in the seabed of various parts of the South China Sea, and the strategic control of important shipping lanes. Maritime security is also an issue, as the ongoing disputes present challenges for shipping.

In 1932, France formally claimed both the Paracel and Spratly Islands. China and Japan both protested. On 6 April 1933, France occupied the Spratlys, announced their annexation, and formally included them in French Indochina.

In 1947, Republic of China, the government of then China, announced the majority of South China Sea was its territory. In 1949, the incoming government of China, which overthrew the Republic of China in Chinese Civil War, announced that it had inherited this claim.

In 2013, the PRC began island building in the Spratly Islands and the Paracel Islands region. According to Reuters, island building in the South China Sea primarily by Vietnam and the Philippines has been going on for decades on a small scale; while China has come late to the island building game, its efforts have been on an unprecedented scale as it had from 2014 to 2016 constructed more new island surface than all other nations have constructed throughout history and as of 2016 placed military equipment on one of its artificial islands unlike the other claimants. A 2019 article in Voice of America which compared China and Vietnam's island building campaign in the South China Sea similarly reported the reason why Vietnam in contradistinction to China has been subject to little international criticism and even support was because of the slower speed and widely perceived defensive nature of its island-building project.

China's actions in the South China Sea have been described as part of its "salami slicing"/"cabbage wrapping" strategies, and since 2015 the United States and other states such as France and the United Kingdom have conducted freedom of navigation operations (FONOP) in the region. In July 2016, an arbitration tribunal constituted under Annex VII of the United Nations Convention on the Law of the Sea (UNCLOS) ruled against the PRC's maritime claims in Philippines v. China. The tribunal did not rule on the ownership of the islands or delimit maritime boundaries. Both the People's Republic of China and Taiwan stated that they did not recognize the tribunal and insisted that the matter should be resolved through bilateral negotiations with other claimants. In January 2022, the United States Department of State called China's claims in the South China Sea "unlawful."

Disputes in the South China Sea region

The disputes involve both maritime boundaries and islands. There are several disputes, each of which involves a different collection of countries:
 The nine-dash line area claimed by the Republic of China (1912–1949), later the People's Republic of China (PRC), which covers most of the South China Sea and overlaps with the exclusive economic zone claims of Brunei, Indonesia, Malaysia, the Philippines, Taiwan, and Vietnam.
 Maritime boundary along the Vietnamese coast between the PRC, Taiwan, and Vietnam.
 Maritime boundary north of Borneo between the PRC, Malaysia, Brunei, Philippines, and Taiwan.
 Islands, reefs, banks and shoals in the South China Sea, including the Paracel Islands, Pratas Island and the Vereker Banks, Macclesfield Bank, Scarborough Shoal and the Spratly Islands between the PRC, Taiwan, and Vietnam, and parts of the area also contested by Malaysia and the Philippines.
 Maritime boundary in the waters north of the Natuna Islands between the PRC, Indonesia, Taiwan and Vietnam.
 Maritime boundary off the coast of Palawan and Luzon between the PRC, the Philippines, and Taiwan.
 Maritime boundary, land territory, and the islands of Sabah, including Ambalat, between Indonesia, Malaysia, and the Philippines.
 Maritime boundary and islands in the Luzon Strait between the PRC, the Philippines, and Taiwan.

History 
In 1932, France formally claimed both the Paracel and Spratly Islands. China and Japan both protested. On 6 April 1933, France occupied the Spratlys, announced their annexation, formally included them in French Indochina, and built a couple of weather stations on them.

By May 1939, the Japanese had laid claim and occupied the Paracel and Spratly Islands. During World War II, the Empire of Japan used the islands in the South China Sea for various military purposes and asserted that the islands were not claimed by anyone when the Imperial Japanese Navy took control of them. Historical accounts note that at least France had controlled some of the features in the region during the 1930s. After the war, Imperial Japan had to relinquish control of the islands in the South China Sea in the 1951 Treaty of San Francisco which, however, did not specify the new status of the islands. The People's Republic of China made various claims to the islands during the 1951 treaty negotiations and the 1958 First Taiwan Strait Crisis.

Chinese claims in the South China sea are delineated in part by the nine-dash line. This was originally an "eleven-dashed-line," first indicated by the Kuomintang government of the Republic of China in 1947, for its claims to the South China Sea. When the Chinese Communist Party took over mainland China and formed the People's Republic of China in 1949, the line was adopted and revised to nine dashes/dots, as endorsed by Zhou Enlai. China's 1958 declaration described China's claims in the South China Sea islands based on the nine-dotted line map. The legacy of the nine-dash line is viewed by some PRC government officials, and by the PRC military, as providing historical support for their claims to the South China Sea.

The Geneva Accords of 1954, which ended the First Indochina War, gave South Vietnam control of the Vietnamese territories south of the 17th Parallel, which included the islands in the Paracels and Spratlys.

In 1974, when a North Vietnamese victory in the Vietnam War began to seem probable, the PRC used military force in the Paracel Islands and took Yagong Island and the Crescent group of reefs from South Vietnam. The government of the PRC wanted to prevent the Paracel islands from falling under the control of North Vietnam, which at the time was an ally of the Soviet Union. After not resisting during the initial Vietnamese attack, the PRC launched what they regarded as a "counterattack in self-defense". The United States, in the middle of détente with the PRC, gave a non-involvement promise to the PRC, which enabled the People's Liberation Army Navy to take control of the South Vietnamese islands.

In the later half of 1970s, the Philippines and Malaysia began referring to the Spratly Islands as included in their own territory. On 11 June 1978, President Ferdinand Marcos of the Philippines issued Presidential Decree No. 1596, declaring the north-western part of the Spratly Islands (referred to therein as the Kalayaan Island Group) as Philippine territory.

In 1988, the PRC and Vietnam fought each other near the Johnson Reef. The PRC had obtained a permit from the Intergovernmental Oceanographic Commission to build five observation posts for the conduction of ocean surveys, and one of the permitted observation posts was allowed to be located in the Spratly islands region. The PRC chose to built its observation post on the Fiery Cross Reef, which was isolated from the other islands in the region and was not occupied by any state at the time. When it started to build the observation post in the terra nullius Fiery Cross Reef, Vietnam sent its navy to the area to monitor the situation. The two states clashed near the Johnson Reef, and after the clash, China occupied the Johnson Reef.

In 1994, the PRC occupied Mischief Reef, located some 250 miles from the Philippine coast. Occupation was made in the middle of an energy resources race in the Spratlys, where China lacked a presence while the other countries were starting their oil exploration businesses. Mischief Reef marked the first time when the PRC had a military confrontation with the Philippines, an ally of the United States.

The occupation and/or control of most parts of the Spratly and Paracel islands has not changed significantly from the 90s through to the 2000s. The PRC controls all of the features in the Paracels. In the Spratlys, Vietnam controls most features with 29 in total, while the Philippines has control of eight features, Malaysia with 5, the PRC with 5, and the ROC with 1.

Since 2011 however, tensions started to increase again in the territory. In February, Chinese frigate Donguan fired three shots at Philippine fishing boats near Jackson atoll. In May, the Vietnamese Binh Minh 02 oil and gas survey ship clashed with three Chinese maritime patrol vessels some 600 km south of China's Hainan island.

2012 marked the increased militarization of the islands. The ROC started the construction of an antenna tower and runway on the Taiping island in February, allowing the island to accommodate various military aircraft. On the Vietnam occupied Sand Cay and West Reef islands, upgrades and land reclamation projects were also started at this time. In April, the PRC took the Scarborough Shoal as a response to the Philippine navy's actions of stopping Chinese fishing boats in the area.

In September 2018, a South Korean navy destroyer traveled into what China saw as its territorial waters. A South Korean government official said the navy destroyer was taking refuge from a typhoon and not challenging maritime claims, but he declined to comment on whether Seoul believed the disputed waters belonged to China. A Chinese Defense Ministry spokesman said the ship broke Chinese law by entering its 12-nautical-mile-wide territorial sea around the Paracel Islands without seeking prior permission, but said Beijing accepted South Korea's explanation.

On 22 December 2020, the PRC claimed that the guided missile destroyer John S McCain had been "expelled" after it “trespassed” into Chinese territorial waters close to the Spratly Islands. However this claim has been disputed by the US Navy.

In March 2021, 220 Chinese fishing boats were seen moored around Whitsun Reef in the Spratly Islands, a reef claimed by the Philippines as part of its exclusive economic zone. Philippines Defense Minister Delfin Lorenzana accused China of "provocative action of militarizing the area".

2011 agreement 
On 20 July 2011, the PRC, Brunei, Malaysia, the Philippines, Taiwan and Vietnam agreed a set of preliminary guidelines on the implementation of the DOC (Declaration of Conduct of Parties in the South China Sea) which would help resolve disputes. This set of guidelines is based on an earlier agreement, also called DOC, from 2002, between China and the ASEAN Member States.

The agreement was described by the PRC's assistant foreign minister, Liu Zhenmin, as "an important milestone document for cooperation among China and ASEAN countries". Some of the early drafts acknowledged aspects such as "marine environmental protection, scientific research, safety of navigation and communication, search and rescue and combating transnational crime", although the issue of oil and natural gas drilling remains unresolved. "Following the spirit of the Declaration on the Conduct of Parties in the South China Sea (DOC), China and ASEAN countries actively advanced the consultations on the Code of Conduct (COC) in the South China Sea," with the forecast that the COC will be completed by 2021.

Chinese objection to Indian military presence and oil exploration 

On 22 July 2011, the INS Airavat, an Indian amphibious assault vessel on a friendly visit to Vietnam, was reportedly contacted 45 nautical miles from the Vietnamese coast in the disputed South China Sea by a party identifying itself as the PLA Navy and stating that the ship was entering PRC waters. A spokesperson for the Indian Navy explained that as no ship or aircraft was visible, the INS Airavat proceeded on her onward journey as scheduled. The Indian Navy further clarified that "[t]here was no confrontation involving the INS Airavat. India supports freedom of navigation in international waters, including in the South China Sea, and the right of passage in accordance with accepted principles of international law. These principles should be respected by all."

In September 2011, shortly after the PRC and Vietnam signed an agreement seeking to contain a dispute over the South China Sea, India's state-run explorer, Oil and Natural Gas Corporation (ONGC) said that its overseas investment arm, ONGC Videsh Limited, had signed a three-year agreement with PetroVietnam for developing long-term co-operation in the oil sector, and that it had accepted Vietnam's offer of exploration in certain specified blocks in the South China Sea. However, this agreement between India and Vietnam has provoked attacks from the PRC In response, PRC Foreign Ministry spokesperson Jiang Yu, without referring to India by name, stated:"As for oil and gas exploration activities, our consistent position is that we are opposed to any country engaging in oil and gas exploration and development activities in waters under China's jurisdiction. We hope the foreign countries do not get involved in South China Sea dispute.""China warns India on South China Sea exploration projects" , The Hindu, 15 September 2011. An Indian foreign ministry spokesman responded, "The Chinese had concerns, but we are going by what the Vietnamese authorities have told us and we have conveyed this to the Chinese." The Indo-Vietnamese deal was also denounced by the Chinese state-run newspaper Global Times.

Chinese policy on the South China Sea
In Spring 2010, PRC officials reportedly communicated to US officials that the South China Sea was "an area of 'core interest' that is as non-negotiable" and on par with Taiwan and Tibet on the national agenda. However, Beijing appeared to have backed away from that assertion in 2011.

In October 2011, the PRC's Global Times tabloid editorialised on the South China Sea territorial disputes under the banner "Don't take peaceful approach for granted". The article referenced incidents earlier that year involving the Philippines and South Korea detaining PRC fishing boats in the region. "If these countries don't want to change their ways with China, they will need to prepare for the sounds of cannons. We need to be ready for that, as it may be the only way for the disputes in the sea to be resolved." Responding to questions about whether this reflected official policy, a Chinese Foreign Ministry spokeswoman stated the country's commitment "to resolving the maritime dispute through peaceful means."

In July 2014, Professor Alan Dupont of the University of New South Wales was reported as saying that the Chinese government appeared to be directing its fishing fleet into disputed waters as a matter of policy.

From 2013 to the beginning of 2018, China carried out land reclamation in the South China Sea. The construction of the islands has been completed. The three island airports of Meiji Reef, Zhubi Reef, and Yongshu Reef have been completed.

In August 2019, China's paramount leader Xi Jinping told Philippine President Rodrigo Duterte that China would not recognise or abide by the Arbitration decision. China rejects the arbitration proceedings as illegitimate because China excluded itself from compulsory arbitration in its ratification of the 2006 United Nations Convention on the Laws of the Seas (UNCLOS). Xi made his comments during a visit by Duterte to Beijing, with discussions between the two leaders. This stance by Beijing is in line with the July 2019 publishing of a Chinese White Paper, "China's National Defense in the New Era," which details China's armed strength and repeatedly mentions deployment in the South China Sea. On 22 September 2020, in a recorded speech at the opening of the 75th session of the UN General Assembly, the Philippine President, Rodrigo Duterte reaffirmed the Hague ruling rejecting most of China's claims to disputed waters, and said "The award is now part of international law, beyond compromise and beyond the reach of passing governments to dilute, diminish, or abandon."

Oil and gas development 
The area is said to be rich in oil and natural gas deposits; however, the estimates are highly varied. The Chinese Ministry of Geological Resources and Mining estimated that the South China Sea may contain 17.7 billion barrels of crude oil, compared to the oil rich country of Kuwait which has 13 billion barrels. In the years following the announcement by the PRC ministry, the claims regarding the South China Sea islands intensified. However, other sources claim that the proven reserves of oil in the South China Sea may only be 7.5 billion barrels, or about 1.1 billion barrels. According to the US Energy Information Administration (EIA)'s profile of the South China Sea region, a US Geological Survey estimate puts the region's discovered and undiscovered oil reserves at 11 billion barrels, as opposed to a PRC figure of 125 billion barrels. The same EIA report also points to the wide variety of natural gas resource estimations, ranging from 190 trillion cubic feet to 500 trillion cubic feet, likely located in the contested Reed Bank".

The state-owned China Offshore Exploration Corp. planned to spend 200 billion RMB (US$30 billion) in the next 20 years to exploit oil in the region, with the estimated production of 25 million metric tons of crude oil and natural gas per annum, at a depth of 2000 meters within the next five years.

Competing claims in the oil and gas-rich South China Sea have stifled the development and exploitation of these resources. To break from this, the Philippines and China agreed to a Memorandum of Understanding (MoU) on Cooperation on Oil and Gas Development in November 2018, where joint-use of, and not ownership over assets underlies the agreement. In the past, aggressive Chinese naval patrols deterred Manila from exploring gas deposits in disputed waters, like the Reed Bank, such that this type of agreement may allow for the claimant states to jointly develop the natural gas in the offshore area. The mechanism of joint agreements is not new, with Malaysia and Vietnam having forged a similar mechanism in 1992, while Malaysia and Thailand reached understandings in 1979 and 1990 over the development of gas-rich disputed waters.

Philippines 
The Philippines began exploring the areas west of Palawan for oil in 1970. Exploration in the area began in Reed Bank/Tablemount. In 1976, gas was discovered following the drilling of a well. However, the PRC's complaints halted the exploration. On 27 March 1984, the first Philippine oil company discovered an oil field off Palawan, which is an island province bordering the South China Sea and the Sulu Sea. These oil fields supply 15% of annual oil consumption in the Philippines.

Vietnam 
Vietnam and Japan reached an agreement early in 1978 on the development of oil in the South China Sea. By 2012 Vietnam had concluded some 60 oil and gas exploration and production contracts with various foreign companies. In 1986, the "White Tiger" oil field in the South China Sea came into operation, producing over 2,000 tons of crude oil per year, followed by "The Bear" and "Dragon" oil fields. Offshore exploration activities in 2011 increased Vietnam's proven oil reserves to be the third largest in the Asia-Pacific region. However, the country is a net importer of oil products. In 2009 petroleum accounted for 14 percent of Vietnamese government income, down from 24 percent in 2004.

In 2017, after Chinese pressure, the Vietnamese government ordered Spain's Repsol to stop drilling in the disputed area. A joint-venture of Japanese Inpex and Petrovietnam plans to start drilling in the disputed area in 2021.

China 
China's first independently designed and constructed oil drilling platform in the South China Sea is the Ocean Oil 981. The major shareholders are J.P. Morgan Chase & Co. (19%), Commonwealth Bank of Australia (14%), T. Rowe Price Associates, Inc. and affiliates (6%), and BlackRock, Inc. (5%). On 2 May 2014 the platform was moved near to the Paracel Islands, a move Vietnam stated violated their territorial claims. Chinese officials said it was legal, stating the area lies in waters surrounding the Paracel Islands which China occupies and militarily controls.

Incidents involving fishermen
Prior to the territorial disputes, fishermen from involved countries tended to enter each other's controlled islands and Exclusive Economic Zones (EEZ) leading to conflicts with the authorities that controlled the areas as they were unaware of the exact borders. As well, due to depletion of the fishing resources in their maritime areas, they were forced to fish in the neighbouring countries' areas.

In 2006 the captain of a Taiwanese fishing boat was shot dead and a crewman wounded when their boat was reportedly attacked by pirates wearing military uniforms. Philippine authorities assured the Taiwan Ministry of Foreign Affairs that no Filipino naval or coast guard personnel were involved in the incident.

A Taiwanese fisherman was machine gunned to death by the coast guard of the Philippines in May 2013.

In the spring of 2014, China and Vietnam clashed again over China's Haiyang Shiyou oil rig in Vietnam's EEZ. The incident left seventeen Vietnamese injured and damaged ships of both countries.

Although Indonesia is not part of claims in the South China Sea dispute, after Joko Widodo became President of the country in 2014, he instituted a policy in 2015 that, if any foreign fishermen were caught illegally fishing in Indonesian waters, their vessels would be destroyed. The president wanted to make maritime resources, especially fisheries, a key component of his administration's economic policy. Since the policy's initiation, fishing vessels drawing from many neighbouring countries were destroyed by Indonesian authorities. On 21 May 2015, around 41 fishing vessels from China, Vietnam, Thailand and the Philippines were destroyed. On 19 March 2016, the China Coast Guard prevented the detention of Chinese fishermen by Indonesian authorities after Chinese fishermen were caught fishing near the waters around Natuna, leading to a protest by Indonesian authorities; the Chinese ambassador was subsequently summonsed as China had considered the areas to be "Chinese traditional fishing grounds". Further Indonesian campaigns against foreign fishermen resulted in the destruction of 23 fishing boats from Malaysia and Vietnam on 5 April 2016.

Out of the 556 ships Indonesia had destroyed from October 2014 to 2019 for violating rules, 312 of them were from Vietnam, 91 were from the Philippines, 87 were from Malaysia, 26 were local, and 3 were from China. The areas in the South China Sea had also become known for Indonesian pirates, with frequent attacks on Malaysian, Singaporean and Vietnamese vessels as well as leading to hijacking such as the MT Orkim Harmony and MT Zafirah hijacking incidents. The continuing war against foreign fishermen by Indonesia led to protests by Vietnam in late 2016, when a Vietnamese fisherman was killed after being shot by Indonesian authorities. Attacks have also come from Filipino and Moro pirates arriving from the Sulu Sea; a Vietnamese fisherman was killed by Filipino pirates in late 2015.

In 2017, two Vietnamese fishermen died from gunshot wounds from a pursuing Philippine Navy patrol boat about 40 miles off the city of Bolinao, Pangasinan. A police report said that the boats had collided after the navy had fired warning shots; the Philippine government Philippine government said on Monday that it had promised Vietnam a “fair and thorough” investigation.

Teodoro Locsin Jr., the Filipino Secretary of Foreign Affairs, said the Philippines was building a maritime fleet that could swarm areas in the South China Sea. He said the fleet build up was because of China which was also doing the same thing. He also said if one of the vessels got hit, the Filipino defense treaty with the United States would also be activated.

Security summits 
The Shangri-La Dialogue serves as the "Track One" exchange forum on security issues surrounding the Asia-Pacific region. The South China Sea territorial disputes has dominated proceedings at the conference in recent years. The Council for Security Cooperation in the Asia Pacific is the "Track Two" forum for dialogue on security issues.

In February 2016, U.S. President Barack Obama initiated the US-ASEAN Summit at Sunnylands in Rancho Mirage, California for closer engagement with the Association of Southeast Asian Nations. Territorial disputes in the South China Sea were a major topic, but its joint statement, the "Sunnylands Declaration", did not name the South China Sea, instead calling for "respect of each nation's sovereignty and for international law". Analysts believe it indicates divisions within the group on how to respond to China's maritime strategy.

Non-claimant views

Third-party analysis
The vast majority of international legal experts have concluded that China's claims based on legal and historical evidence are invalid.

Japanese scholar Taoka Shunji said in a journal article that when it came to China's advance in the South China Sea and the Spratly Islands, the assumption amongst many Japanese people that the territory of the Philippines was being invaded was incorrect. He pointed out that the Spratly islands were not part of the Philippines, when the US acquired the Philippines from Spain in the Treaty of Paris in 1898. It has been argued that the U.S. acquired prior Spanish claim to the islands by the 1900 Treaty of Washington. However, when the Japanese-ruled Taiwan itself had annexed the Spratly islands in 1938, the US -ruled Philippines did not challenge the move and never asserted that it was their territory. He also pointed out that other countries did not need to do full land reclamation since they already control islands, and that the reason China engaged in extensive land reclamation is because they needed it to build airfields since China only has control over reefs.

UNCLOS tribunal
In July 2016, the Permanent Court of Arbitration (PCA), an internationally agreed arbitration tribunal sitting in the Hague and constituted under Annex VII of the United Nations Convention on the Law of the Sea (UNCLOS), ruled comprehensively against the People's Republic of China's South China Sea maritime claims in Philippines v. China. This tribunal did not rule on the ownership of the islands or delimit maritime boundaries.

However, both mainland China and Taiwan stated that they did not recognize the tribunal and insisted that the matter should be resolved through bilateral negotiations with other claimants. On 17 September 2020, France, Germany, and the United Kingdom issued a joint note verbale recognizing the PCA ruling and challenging China's claims.

In response to the ruling, Graham Allison stated, "None of the five permanent members of the UN Security Council have ever accepted any international court's ruling when (in their view) it infringed their sovereignty or national security interests. Thus, when China rejects the Court's decision in this case, it will be doing just what the other great powers have repeatedly done for decades."

Australia 

On 25 July 2020 Australia rejected China's claims to the South China Sea and filed a statement with the United Nations that said: "Australia rejects any claims to internal waters, territorial sea, exclusive economic zone and continental shelf based on such baselines," and there is "no legal basis" to draw the nine-dash line around the Four Sha archipelagos, Paracel and Spratly Islands or low-tide maritime zones. They encourage the claimants to resolve their disputes peacefully.

Cambodia 
Cambodia has backed China over the dispute in ASEAN meetings, preventing consensus over unified ASEAN action. Anti-Vietnamese sentiment due to Vietnam's conquest of previously Cambodian lands, giving the Vietnamese a privileged status and encouragement of Vietnamese settlers in Cambodia during French colonial rule, and the occupation of Cambodia after the ousting of the Khmer Rouge has led to anti-Vietnamese feelings against ethnic Vietnamese in Cambodia and against Vietnam, and in turn has led to pro-China sentiment among the Cambodian government and the Cambodian opposition, including in the South China Sea.

India 

India says that the South China Sea was "part of global commons and India has an abiding interest in peace and stability in the region... We firmly stand for the freedom of navigation and overflight and unimpeded lawful commerce in these international waterways, in accordance with international law, notably UNCLOS." This was seen as largely backing the US position.

Indonesia

Since early in the South China Sea dispute, Indonesia has repeatedly asserted its position as a non-claimant state in the South China Sea dispute, and often positioned itself as an "honest broker". However, parts of China's unilaterally claimed nine-dash line overlap Indonesia's exclusive economic zone near the Natuna islands. Although China has acknowledged Indonesia's sovereignty over the Natuna islands, the PRC has argued that the waters around the Natuna islands are Chinese "traditional fishing grounds". Indonesia quickly dismissed China's claim, asserting that China's nine-dash line claim over parts of the Natuna islands has no legal basis. In November 2015, Indonesia's security chief Luhut Pandjaitan said Indonesia could take China before an international court. Indonesia filed a comment with the Permanent Court of Arbitration regarding China's claim in the case of Philippines v. China.

Chinese fishing vessels – often escorted by Chinese coastguard ships – have repeatedly been reported to have breached Indonesian waters near the Natuna islands. On 19 March 2016, for example, Indonesian authorities tried to capture a Chinese trawler accused of illegal fishing in Indonesian waters, and arrested the Chinese crew. They were prevented from towing the boat to harbour by a Chinese coast guard vessel which reportedly "rammed" the trawler in Indonesian waters. "To prevent anything else occurring, the Indonesian authorities let go of the Chinese boat and then left toward Natuna, still with eight fishermen and the captain on board," said Arrmanatha Nasir, a spokesman for Indonesia's Foreign Ministry. Indonesia still has the Chinese crew in custody. On 21 March 2016, minister for fisheries and maritime affairs Susi Pudjiastuti summoned the Chinese ambassador, Xie Feng, and discussed this matter. Indonesia insists that they have the right to prosecute the Chinese trawler crew, despite Beijing's demand to release their eight fishermen. Arif Havas Oegroseno, the government official of maritime security, said that the Chinese claim of "traditional fishing grounds" was not recognised under the 1982 United Nations Convention on the Law of the Sea. This incident prompted security minister Luhut Pandjaitan to deploy more troops and patrol boats, and to strengthen the Ranai naval base in the area.

Following the clashes, on 23 June 2016, Indonesian President Joko Widodo visited the Natuna islands on a warship to demonstrate Indonesia's authority. He led a high-level delegation, which included the Commander of the Indonesian National Armed Forces (TNI) and state ministers. Security Minister Luhut Pandjaitan said it was meant to send a "clear message" that Indonesia was "very serious in its effort to protect its sovereignty".

Following the Permanent Court of Arbitration ruling on 12 July 2016, Indonesia called on all parties involved in the territorial dispute to exercise self-restraint and to respect applicable international laws.

Indonesia challenged the Chinese nine-dash historical claim by arguing that if the historical claims can be used on presenting the territorial naval claims, Indonesia might also use its historical claims on the South China Sea by referring to the ancient influence of the Srivijaya and Majapahit empires.

Indonesia's EEZ extends 200 nautical miles (370 km) from its shores, which around Natuna means it is slightly intersected by China's Nine-Dash Line, defining its widely disputed claim to most of the South China Sea. In 2014–2015, the presence of the TNI on the islands was reinforced, which the Indonesian government hoped would reduce the chance of any conflict. Then in early 2020, a further 600 troops were deployed and eight navy warships from the Indonesian Navy including Ahmad Yani-class frigates, Bung Tomo-class corvettes, and Kapitan Pattimura-class ASW corvettes were sent to the area with support from the Indonesian Navy Naval Aviation CN-235 MPA, the Indonesian Air Force also sent 4 F-16 and a Boeing 737-2x9 Surveillance, and put BAE Hawk aircraft nearby on alert after Chinese fishing vessels increased illegal activity within the EEZ, escorted by a Chinese Coast Guard vessel. A recent visit to the area by President Joko Widodo displayed Indonesia's resolve to not overlook such incursions.

Japan 
Japan has used "normative power" via strategic foreign aid to certain claimants in the dispute such as the Philippines and Vietnam in order to assert its presence in the region as promoting the "rule of law at sea."

Laos 
Laos has supported China by refusing to accept the Permanent Court of Arbitration ruling on China's sovereignty claims in the South China Sea.

Singapore 
Singapore has reiterated that it is not a claimant state in the South China Sea dispute and has offered to play a neutral role in being a constructive conduit for dialogue among the claimant states. Prime Minister Lee Hsien Loong said during his official visit to the US that he hoped all countries will respect international law and the outcome of arbitration. The spokesperson of China Hua Chunying responded in a press conference said that the award by the Arbitral Tribunal was "illegal" and "invalid", and thus not binding at all. She urged Singapore to respect China's position, stay objective and impartial.

Sri Lanka 
Kabir Hashim, General Secretary of the United National Party, has said that the South China Sea disputes should be resolved through bilateral talks between China and the countries concerned rather than being subject to external forces.

Thailand 

Thailand as one of the member of ASEAN played a coordinating role in facilitating China and ASEAN members involved in the dispute in hope of reaching peaceful resolution. Despite its domestic political turmoil, the Thai government relied on its Ministry of Foreign Affairs' expertise on international dispute. It took the initiative to hold several meetings with parties concerned. Thailand's first attempt was hosting the ASEAN–China Senior Officials' Meeting Retreat in Pattaya, Thailand 2012. Via this meeting, Wang Yi, the Chinese Foreign Minister called for a joint development of resources in South China Sea. Bangkok was viewed as a South China Sea neutral player because it is not a claimant and did not have disputes in the South China Sea with China. After several meetings, the 6th ASEAN–China SOM on DOC was the first official consultation on the Code of Conduct (COC) was formed with all parties agreement to push forward the drafting of COC. Thai-China relationship was generally seen as positive. Thailand's neutral position enabled it to act as a mediator and influence discussions among parties involved.

United States 

In 1974, the PRC got a non-involvement promise from the United States when it occupied the Yagong Island and the Crescent Group from South Vietnam. The United States officially addressed the South China Sea dispute for the first time in 1995, when its statement focused on the peaceful resolution of disputes, peace and stability, freedom of navigation, neutrality over the question of sovereignty, and respect of maritime norms. The 1995 statement did not name any states by their names.

The 1995 policy was changed in 2010, when the administration of the President Obama felt that even though the United States cannot take sides in the dispute, it still has to make a statement that it is not passively accepting the assertive actions taken in the region. At the July 2010 Association of Southeast Asian Nations Regional Forum meeting in Hanoi, Secretary of State Hillary Clinton gave a speech on resolving the disputes in the region without coercion and unequivocally stating that the South China Sea was a matter of U.S. national interest. Her comments were countered by China's Foreign Minister Yang Jiechi as "in effect an attack on China," and he warned the United States against making the South China Sea an international issue or multilateral issue.

In 2012, a United States State Department press statement identified the PRC as an assertive state in the region and communicated United States concerns about the developments in the area. Also in 2012, Secretary Clinton testified in support of congressional approval of the Law of the Sea Convention, which would strengthen U.S. ability to support countries that oppose Chinese claims to certain islands in the area. On 29 May 2012, a spokesman for the Chinese Foreign Ministry expressed concern over this development, stating that "non-claimant Association of South East Asian Nations countries and countries outside the region have adopted a position of not getting involved into territorial disputes." In July 2012, the United States Senate passed resolution 524, initially sponsored by Senator John Kerry, stating (among other things) the United States' strong support for the 2002 declaration of conduct of parties in the South China Sea, reaffirms the United States' commitment to assist the nations of Southeast Asia to remain strong and independent, and supports enhanced operations by the United States armed forces in the Western Pacific.

In 2014, the United States responded to China's claims over the fishing grounds of other nations by saying that "China has not offered any explanation or basis under international law for these extensive maritime claims." USN CNO Jonathan Greenert then pledged American support to the Philippines in its territorial conflicts with the PRC. The Chinese Foreign Ministry asked the United States to maintain a neutral position on the issue. In 2014 and 2015, the United States continued freedom of navigation operations, including in the South China Sea.  that the US administration is planning to deploy some more naval assets within 12 nautical miles of the Spratly Islands. In response to this announcement, Beijing issued a warning and said that she would not allow any country to violate China's territorial waters in the name of "Freedom of Navigation". In May 2015, U.S. Secretary of Defense Ash Carter warned China to halt its rapid island-building. On 27 October 2015, the US destroyer USS Lassen navigated within 12 nautical miles of reclaimed land in the Subi Reef as the first in a series of "Freedom of Navigation Operations". This was the first time since 2012 that the US has directly challenged China's claims of the island's territorial limit. On 8–9 November 2015, two US B-52 strategic bombers flew near artificial Chinese-built islands in the area of the Spratly Islands and were contacted by Chinese ground controllers but continued their mission undeterred.

President Trump's administration increased the frequency of freedom of navigation operations in the South China Sea. In June 2020, US Ambassador to the United Nations Kelly Craft sent a letter to the U.N. secretary general explaining the US position on China's "excessive maritime claims." On 14 July 2020, US Secretary of State Mike Pompeo declared China's claims and coercions of in parts of the South China Sea “completely unlawful”. On 26 August 2020, the US sanctioned individuals and 24 Chinese companies linked to construction and militarization of the artificial islands.

Publications by US think tanks have made recommendations for courses of actions that the United States could take in response to PRC activities in the South China Sea.

The US Navy has conducted freedom of navigation drills in the South China Sea to counter Vietnamese claims in the region, particularly around the Côn Đảo islands.

See also 
 Continental Shelf
 East China Sea EEZ disputes
 First island chain
 Great wall of sand
 List of maritime features in the Spratly Islands
 North Borneo dispute
 Philippines v. China
 Scarborough Shoal standoff
 South China Sea
 South China Sea Islands
 Spratly Islands
 Spratly Islands dispute
 Senkaku Islands
 Senkaku Islands dispute
 Territorial claims in the Arctic
 Territorial claims in Antarctica
 Chinese expansionism
 21st Century Maritime Silk Road

References

Citations

Sources

Further reading 

 
 
 
 
 
 
 
 
 
 
 
 
 
 Zhang. Ketian. “Cautious Bully: Reputation, Resolve, and Beijing's Use of Coercion in the South China Sea,” International Security 44:1 (Summer 2019): 117–159.

External links 
 Website of the Chinese National Institute for South China Sea Studies
 Website of the Vietnamese Program for South China Sea Studies Chương trình nghiên cứu Biển Đông 
  - the published presentation notes, including supportive illustrations and footnotes for a presentation at the Philippine Institute for Marine and Ocean Affairs of the López Museum and Library (event release)

Disputed territories in Southeast Asia
South China Sea

Territorial disputes of China
Territorial disputes of Malaysia
Territorial disputes of Vietnam
Territorial disputes of the Philippines
Territorial disputes of Indonesia